Daemilus rufus is a moth of the family Tortricidae. It is found in Vietnam.

The wingspan is 16 mm. The wings are brownish ferruginous, but more cream along the costa, with sparse darker fine strigulae (streaks). The subapical blotch is slender and much darker than the ground colour. The hindwings are brown.

Etymology
The specific epithet refers to colouration of the forewing and is derived from Latin rufus (meaning rust).

References

Moths described in 2009
Archipini
Moths of Asia
Taxa named by Józef Razowski